Finedon Cally Banks is a  nature reserve north-east of Wellingborough in Northamptonshire. It is managed by the Wildlife Trust for Bedfordshire, Cambridgeshire and Northamptonshire.

The site was formerly used to burn ironstone to remove impurities, leaving a layer of calcine, which produces poor soil in which wildflowers flourish. The reserve also includes a stretch of railway embankment for transporting the iron ore. Flora include common spotted orchids, great reedmace, kidney vetch and meadowsweet.

There is access by a footpath from Harrowden Lane and along the railway embankment from Finedon.

References

Wildlife Trust for Bedfordshire, Cambridgeshire and Northamptonshire reserves
Finedon